The Cameo Creme is a chocolate sandwich biscuit with a coconut cream filling made by Griffin's Foods of New Zealand.

Cameo Cremes are available in 250g single packs. Alternative flavours that were available previously included Jaffa and Mint Creme.

A brass Cameo Creme biscuit press used in the Lower Hutt Griffins factory is an object in the History Collection in the Museum of New Zealand/Te Papa Tongarewa in Wellington.

Ingredients

Cameo Cremes are made with wheat flour, sugar, vegetable fat, emulsifier (soya lecithin), antioxidant (306), invert syrup, milk solids, cocoa powder, coconut, cornflour, salt, edible colors (150, 110, 155), raising agents (500, 450) and flavors.

References

External links

Biscuit brands
New Zealand confectionery